PSLV-C1 was the overall fourth mission of the Polar Satellite Launch Vehicle (PSLV) program by Indian Space Research Organisation (ISRO). The vehicle carried IRS-1D satellite which was deployed in the Sun-synchronous orbit (SSO). This was India's first launch vehicle built without Russian assistance and PSLV's first operational flight placed IRS-1D into a polar orbit. However, it could not place the satellite in the desired circular orbit but in an elliptical orbit due to a leak of helium gas from one of the components. The mission was termed partial failure since the satellite could not be placed at the desired altitude.

Mission parameters 
 Mass:
 Total liftoff weight: 
 Payload weight: 

 Overall height: 

 Propellant: 
 Stage 1: Solid HTPB based
 Stage 2: Liquid UH 25 + 
 Stage 3: Solid HTPB based
 Stage 4: Liquid MMH + MON-3

 Altitude: 

 Maximum velocity:  (recorded at time of fourth stage cut-off)

 Inclination: 98.7°

 Period: 1090.52 seconds

Launch 
PSLV-C1 was launched at 04:47 UTC on 29 September 1997 from Satish Dhawan Space Centre (then called "Sriharikota Launching Range"). The vehicle placed the IRS-1D satellite in the Sun-synchronous orbit.

See also 
 Indian Space Research Organisation
 Polar Satellite Launch Vehicle

References 

Spacecraft launched in 1997
Polar Satellite Launch Vehicle